Elizabethtown is a village in and the county seat of Hardin County, Illinois, United States, along the Ohio River. The population was 299 at the 2010 census, down from 348 at the 2000 census. It is the least-populous county seat in the state.

History

One of the earliest settlers in the area of the future village of Elizabethtown was James McFarland who arrived around 1809. The village was later founded around the McFarland Tavern built in 1812. The tavern later became the site of the Rose Hotel named after the owner Sarah Rose. Up until the 1960s when it closed as a hotel the Rose Hotel was the oldest continuously run hotel in the state of Illinois and is now a state historic site. Elizabethtown was named after James McFarland's wife. The First Baptist Church located in Elizabethtown, is the oldest Baptist church congregation in Illinois and the oldest known Protestant church in Illinois, founded in 1806.
 Elizabethtown is referred to as "Etown" by the local population as the nickname is preserved in the name of the downtown E'town River Restaurant.

Geography
Elizabethtown is located in southern Hardin County at  (37.449136, -88.303748). It is bordered to the south by the Ohio River, which forms the state boundary with Kentucky.

Illinois Route 146 passes through the village, leading southwest (downriver)  to Golconda and east  to Illinois Route 1 north of Cave-In-Rock.

Demographics

As of the 2000 United States Census, there were 348 people, 183 households, and 99 families residing in the village. The racial makeup of the village was 97.99% White, 1.44% African American, and 0.57% from two or more races. Hispanic or Latino of any race were 0.29% of the population.

There were 183 households, out of which 18.6% had children under the age of 18 living with them, 38.8% were married couples living together, 12.6% had a female householder with no husband present, and 45.9% were non-families. 44.8% of all households were made up of individuals, and 27.3% had someone living alone who was 65 years of age or older.  The average household size was 1.90 and the average family size was 2.63.

In the village, the population was spread out, with 17.0% under the age of 18, 8.3% from 18 to 24, 15.5% from 25 to 44, 30.2% from 45 to 64, and 29.0% who were 65 years of age or older.  The median age was 51 years. For every 100 females, there were 87.1 males.  For every 100 females age 18 and over, there were 81.8 males.

The median income for a household in the village was $17,750, and the median income for a family was $38,750. Males had a median income of $30,625 versus $16,563 for females. The per capita income for the village was $17,567.  About 16.0% of families and 22.5% of the population were below the poverty line, including 40.0% of those under age 18 and 17.1% of those age 65 or over.

See also
Elizabethtown (disambiguation)
List of cities and towns along the Ohio River

References

Villages in Hardin County, Illinois
County seats in Illinois
Illinois populated places on the Ohio River